Kheybar may refer to:
F.C. Kheybar Khorramabad, An Iranian football club
Kheybar, Ilam
Kheybar, Kermanshah
Kheybar Rural District, in Khuzestan Province